Wuzhishan may refer to:

 Wuzhi Shan, a mountain in Hainan, China
 Wuzhishan City, named after the nearby mountain
 Wuzhishan mountain, Hsinchu County, Taiwan
 Wuzhishan mountain, Taipei County, Taiwan
 Wuzhishan pig (“WZSP”), a breed of Chinese miniature pig